The women's 400 metre freestyle competition of the swimming events at the 1987 Pan American Games took place on 11 August at the Indiana University Natatorium. The last Pan American Games champion was Tiffany Cohen of US.

This race consisted of eight lengths of the pool, with all eight being in the freestyle stroke.

Results
All times are in minutes and seconds.

Heats

Final 
The final was held on August 11.

References

Swimming at the 1987 Pan American Games
Pan